Sepia plana is a species of cuttlefish native to the coast of Australia, specifically the North West Shelf ( to ). However, cuttlebones of this species have also been found off eastern Australia, suggesting that it may have a wider distribution. S. plana lives at depths of between 396 and 505 m.

S. plana exhibits sexual dimorphism, as females grow considerably larger than males. They reach a mantle length of 151 mm and 99 mm, respectively.

The type specimen was collected in the North West Shelf, western Australia. It is deposited at the Museum of Victoria in Melbourne.

References

External links

Cuttlefish
Molluscs described in 1997
Cephalopods of Australia
Taxa named by Amanda Reid (malacologist)